California Dreaming is Rick’s ninth studio album which is a 2017 collaborative album of covers by Australian singer-songwriters and musicians Rick Price and Jack Jones. The album sees Rick and Jack teaming together to re-imagine their favourite songs of the 1960s and 1970s California Sound era. The album was produced in Nashville by Sony executive Robert Rigby and is released through Sony Music Australia. The eponymous first single, by The Mamas & the Papas, was released in August. Songs from the album include hits by Neil Young and the Eagles. The album was released digitally and physically on 29 September and peaked at number 7 on the ARIA charts.

In October 2017, the duo announced Australian tour dates for May 2018. Jones said “Rick and I have been talking about doing something for close to two decades… it was a great opportunity to work together and celebrate great artists, some great songs and a certain time and genre. That period in music will never be repeated again. And now we get to play them live!”

Background and release
In a statement, Price said: "I felt we needed to pay homage to these songs and be respectful to the melodies and arrangements and not drift too far off the reservation. But, at the same time we wanted to add some things here and there that made a difference."

Price and Jones' friendship dates back to the early 1990s when Jones was the lead singer of pop band Southern Sons. Both artists have released platinum selling albums.

Jones stated: "Rick and I have been talking about doing something for close to two decades... it was a great opportunity to work together and celebrate great artists, some great songs and a certain time and genre. That period in music will never be repeated again.

Reception
Stack Magazine said "What a magical combination this is – two guys who can sing like angels with a songbook that’s second to none."

Geoff Jenke from Event Adelaide said the album was a "stellar set of songs beautifully recorded" but said "the problem is they are so faithful to the originals, it has you wanting to drag the originals out and play them."

Track listing

Charts

California Dreaming Tour 2018
Rick Price and Jack Jones had scheduled to tour the album around venue's around Australia, on various dates in May, however the tour was cancelled, Price instead announced he will instead tour later in the year his iconic Heaven Knows album None of these shows took place; the tour was cancelled.

Release history

References

2017 albums
Covers albums
Collaborative albums
Rick Price albums
Sony Music Australia albums